The event was being held for the first time since 1997. Jim Courier was the last champion.

Marat Safin won the title, beating Mikhail Youzhny 7–6(7–4), 7–5 in the final.

Seeds

Draw

Finals

Top half

Bottom half

Qualifying

Seeds

Qualifiers

Lucky loser
  Prakash Amritraj

Qualifying draw

First qualifier

Second qualifier

Third qualifier

Fourth qualifier

References

External links
 Main Draw (ATP)
 Qualifying Draw (ATP)
 Official results archive (ITF)

2004 ATP Tour
2004 China Open (tennis)